Lesično is a village in the Municipality of Kozje in eastern Slovenia. The area is part of the historical Styria region. The municipality is included in the Savinja Statistical Region.

The local church is dedicated to Saint Ulrich and belongs to the Parish of Pilštanj. It was first mentioned in written documents dating to 1394.

References

External links
Lesično on Geopedia

Populated places in the Municipality of Kozje